Sea of Light is the 19th album by the British rock band Uriah Heep, released in April 1995. Its songs have remained part of the band's live set to this day. Bassist Trevor Bolder sings lead on "Fear of Falling" and delivers four songs for this album, as many as on the predecessor Different World, a count he never reaches before and after. Roger Dean was responsible for the sleeve painting, his third for Uriah Heep.

Track listing

Personnel
Uriah Heep
Mick Box – guitars, backing vocals
Lee Kerslake – drums, backing vocals
Trevor Bolder – bass guitar, backing vocals, vocals on track 6
Phil Lanzon – keyboards, backing vocals
Bernie Shaw – vocals

Additional musicians
Piet Sielck – additional keyboards
Pete Beckett – additional backing vocals, strings arrangements on "Love in Silence"
Rolf Köhler – additional backing vocals

Production
Kalle Trapp – producer, engineer, mixing

Charts

References

Uriah Heep (band) albums
Albums with cover art by Roger Dean (artist)
1995 albums
SPV/Steamhammer albums